Aristocrates may refer to more than one person from ancient Greek history:
 Aristocrates of Orchomenus, tyrant of Orchomenus, c. 7th century BCE
 Aristocrates of Athens, subject of an oration of Demosthenes, c. 4th century BCE
 Aristocrates of Rhodes, a general of the Rhodians around 154 BCE, apparently in the war against Crete.
 Aristocrates of Sparta, son of Hipparchus, was a historian who wrote a work on the affairs of Sparta (Λακωνικά), which is quoted by the writer Athenaeus, and is also referred to by Plutarch and other writers.

Notes